Nando Reis & Os Infernais is a Brazilian rock band founded by Nando Reis. It is the band that plays with him in studio and during live performances for his solo albums. From MTV Ao Vivo on, all albums by Nando Reis started being credited to both him and the band. Around the time of Sim e Nãos release, he explained the change: "[...] I write songs and we decide the arrangements as a team. It was a gradual perception [the name change from Nando Reis to Nando Reis e os Infernais], when I realized that I liked to be seen as an artist who had a conversation with the band rather than as an artist backed by a band."

The name of the band, according to him, conveys the idea "of a hot and profane sound. I play the acoustic guitar, but I don't make MPB, my sound is much more connected to Rock."

Before the band was officially founded, keyboardist Alex Veley and guitarist Walter Villaça had already worked with Nando in his solo album Para Quando o Arco-Íris Encontrar o Pote de Ouro, which was recorded in Seattle.

Though Nando lives in São Paulo, the band is based in Rio de Janeiro.

Members

Current members 
Nando Reis: lead vocals, acoustic guitar, songwriter
Walter Villaça: electric guitar
Felipe Cambraia: bass guitar
Diogo Gameiro: drums
Alex Veley: keyboards, backing vocals
Micheline Cardoso: backing vocals
Hanna Lima: backing vocals

Past members 
Carlos Pontual: guitar
Luiz Brasil: acoustic guitar
Cesinha: drums
João Vianna: drums
Marcos Suzano: percussion
Barrett Martin: drums, percussion, backing vocals and accordion
Dadi: bass
Fernando Nunes: double bass

Discography

Studio albums 
(1995) 12 de Janeiro
(2000) Para Quando o Arco-Íris Encontrar o Pote de Ouro
(2001) Infernal
(2003) A Letra A
(2006) Sim e Não
(2009) Drês
(2012) Sei

Live/video albums 
(2004) MTV ao Vivo: Nando Reis & Os Infernais
(2007) Luau MTV: Nando Reis & Os Infernais
(2010) MTV ao Vivo: Nando Reis & Os Infernais - Bailão do Ruivão

References

External links 
 Nando Reis official website 

Musical groups established in 1995
Brazilian rock music groups
Musical groups from Rio de Janeiro (city)
1995 establishments in Brazil